Alexis Amadeo Sabella (born 20 June 2001) is an Argentine professional footballer who plays as an attacking midfielder or winger for Platense, on loan from San Lorenzo.

Career
Sabella joined the San Lorenzo youth ranks midway through 2016. He was promoted into their first-team squad four years later, initially as an unused substitute for a Primera División win away to Aldosivi on 1 March 2020. His senior debut eventually arrived on 7 November 2020 against Estudiantes in the Copa de la Liga Profesional, as he came off the bench to replace Lucas Menossi with thirteen minutes left of a 2–0 victory.

Career statistics
.

Notes

References

External links

2001 births
Living people
Sportspeople from Buenos Aires Province
Argentine people of Italian descent
Argentine footballers
Association football midfielders
Argentine Primera División players
San Lorenzo de Almagro footballers
Club Atlético Platense footballers